The Case Files is a compilation album by American singer-songwriter Peter Case, released in 2011. It consists of unreleased songs, out-takes and demos from Case's solo career.

Critical reception

Allmusic critic Mark Deming wrote "Considering the odds-and-ends nature of this album, it's a pleasant surprise that The Case Files is so consistently strong ... The Case Files proves this man's cast-offs make for a better album than most acts' level-best efforts".

Track listing
All songs written by Peter Case unless otherwise noted.
"(Give Me) One More Mile" – 3:00
"Let's Turn This Thing Around" – 3:13
"Anything (Closing Credits)" – 4:08
"The End" (Al Escovedo) – 3:16
"Good Times, Bad Times" (Mick Jagger, Keith Richards) – 3:17
"Milkcow Blues" (Traditional) – 4:39
"Kokomo Prayer Vigil" – 3:13
"Ballad of the Minimum Wage" – 3:11
"Steel Strings No. 1" – 3:40
"Trusted Friend" – 2:57
"Black Crow Blues" (Bob Dylan) – 3:34
"Round Trip Stranger Blues" – 4:05

Personnel
Peter Case – vocals, guitar, banjo, piano, Wurlitzer
Mel Bransfield-Waters – bass
Stephen Bruton – slide guitar
T-Bone Burnett – guitar, percussion
David Jackson – bass
Duke McVinnie – bass
Dave Meshell – bass
Duane Jarvis – guitar
Andrew Bush – drums
Sandy Chila – drums
David Ensminger – drums
Mr. Bannister – drums
Bryan Head – drums
Ron Franklin – harp
Stan Ridgway – keyboards
Production notes
Doug Olson – engineer, mixing
Stan Ridgway – engineer
Joshua Case – engineer
Pete Lyman – mastering
Geoff Crowe – layout
Anthony Artiagan – cover photo

References

2011 albums
Peter Case albums
Alive Naturalsound Records albums